Edward Nevill, de facto 7th Baron Bergavenny ( – 10 February 1588) was a de facto English peer.

The son of Sir Edward Nevill, he was considered to have succeeded to the Barony upon the death of Henry Nevill, 6th Baron Bergavenny, his first cousin, although by modern doctrine he did not hold that title, as it should have descended to the heir general, the 6th Baron's daughter Mary, Lady Fane.

He married Katherine Brome, with whom he had the following children:
Edward Nevill, 8th Baron Bergavenny ( – 1622)
Francis Nevill
George Nevill
Henry Nevill
Margaret Nevill
Grisel Nevill married Sir Henry Poole
Mary Nevill

He later married Grisold Hughes.

External links
thepeerage.com page (number and title differ)

1530s births
1588 deaths
16th-century English nobility
Edward
Barons Bergavenny (Peerage of England)